Summit Avenue may refer to:
 Summit Avenue (St. Paul), Minnesota
 Summit Avenue (Hudson Palisades), New Jersey
 Summit Avenue, the original name of Journal Square Transportation Center, Jersey City, New Jersey
 Two tram stops on the MBTA Green Line system, Massachusetts:
 Summit Avenue (MBTA station), an existing station on the C branch
 Summit Avenue station (MBTA Green Line B branch), a former station on the B branch